The Harrisonian North American Stage on the geologic timescale is the North American  faunal stage according to the North American Land Mammal Ages chronology (NALMA), typically set from 24,800,000 to 20,600,000 years BP, a period of . It is usually considered to overlap the Chattian and Aquitainian stages within the late Paleogene. The Harrisonian is preceded by the Monroecreekian and followed by the Hemingfordian NALMA stage.

References

Oligocene
Miocene
Arikareean